The 2019–20 Club Universidad Nacional season is the 65th season in the football club's history and the 58th consecutive season in the top flight of Mexican football.

Coaching staff

Players

Torneo Apertura

Players and squad numbers last updated on 3 December 2019.Note: Flags indicate national team as has been defined under FIFA eligibility rules. Players may hold more than one non-FIFA nationality.Ordered by squad number.

Transfers

In

Out

Competitions

Overview

Torneo Apertura

League table

Results summary

Result round by round

Matches

Copa MX

Group stage

Statistics

Squad statistics

Goals

Clean sheets

Disciplinary record

References

External links

Mexican football clubs 2019–20 season
Club Universidad Nacional seasons